The Allegheny Mountain Tunnel is a vehicular tunnel carrying the Pennsylvania Turnpike through the Allegheny Mountains. At this point, the Turnpike carries Interstates 70 and 76. When the tunnel was built, it was considered an "engineering marvel."

The tunnel was built in 1939 and is used by 11 million vehicles annually today. Throughout the 2000s, state officials attempted to implement plans to replace the tunnel, citing its age.

History 
The original Allegheny Mountain Tunnel was built in the late 19th century for the South Pennsylvania Railroad, which was never completed.  This tunnel was not used due to concerns about its structural integrity.

The eastern end of this original tunnel can be seen by parking on the service road at the turnpike's eastern portal and walking up to the area just above and a bit north of the turnpike portal.  The opening is visible in the rocks just uphill.  Entering this old tunnel is prohibited.

The current westbound tunnel was built in 1939 as part of the original construction for the highway. At first, this tunnel served both westbound and eastbound traffic with a single lane in each direction. The eastbound tunnel was completed in 1965 as part of an expansion and upgrade of the turnpike due to increased traffic volume. Both tunnels are approximately 6,070 feet (1,850 m) in length, making them the longest tunnels on the Pennsylvania Turnpike that are still in use (the bypassed Sideling Hill Tunnel is slightly longer, at 6,782 feet (2,067 m)). Explosives and other hazardous materials are not allowed in the tunnels. Vehicles carrying these materials must exit before the tunnel and take other roads around the tunnel. Restrictions on some hazardous materials in non-bulk form have been lifted.

Maintenance and replacement 
Long term plans call for major maintenance to be performed on the tunnels; however, this presents a major problem for traffic. Terrible backups prompted officials to build the second tube.  With today's traffic volumes, it would not be feasible to close one tube and route all traffic through the other.

On October 22, 2013, WJAC-TV reported that the Pennsylvania Turnpike Commission had decided to replace the tunnel with either a new tunnel or a bypass. The reason for the replacement was that officials determined that the tunnel had reached old age and was becoming run-down. By 2013, the original (westbound) tunnel was 73 years old, servicing approximately 11 million vehicles every year. A local hunting group called Mountain Field and Stream Club owns 1,000 acres of land around the tunnel, and the group had opposed plans to replace the tunnel in 2001. Possible plans include building a third tunnel, as well as bypassing the tunnels completely as was done for the Laurel Hill, Rays Hill and Sideling Hill Tunnels. On December 24, 2014, the PTC announced it was going forward with plans to replace the Allegheny Mountain Tunnel.

In 2020, following analysis of several design alternatives, the Pennsylvania Turnpike Commission opted for a new road only alignment to the south of the tunnels, whichat $332 million for the versus $628 million for a replacement tunnelis the least expensive and environmentally disruptive of the alternatives. As part of the project, several sharp curves to the east of the tunnel will be redesigned to meet current standards. The project is funded for design, but not for construction.

References 

Interstate 70
Interstate 76 (Ohio–New Jersey)
Transportation buildings and structures in Somerset County, Pennsylvania
Toll tunnels in Pennsylvania
Tunnels completed in 1939
Pennsylvania Turnpike Commission
Road tunnels in Pennsylvania